Trichoptilosis (from the Greek τριχο- tricho- "hair" and the New Latin ptilosis "arrangement of feathers in definite areas" from the Greek πτίλον  "feather"), schizotrichia, and informally split ends, is the splitting or fraying of the hair-shaft due to excessive heat and mechanical stress.

Causes
Thermal, chemical or mechanical stress can cause split ends. For example, the use of curling irons and other heat treatments may cause split ends. Excessive application of hair products such as perms and hair coloring may strip protective layering off the outside of the hair's shaft and weaken the hair, making the hair prone to split ends. Mechanical stresses include pulling a comb forcefully through tangled hair and repeated combing. Split ends can be a symptom of copper transport disorders such as Menkes disease and occipital horn syndrome. Rubbing the hair up towards the scalp does not cause split ends.

See also

 Trichorrhexis nodosa, sometimes referred to as "bamboo hair", is caused by a genetic condition.

References

Human hair